Ahmed Bedoui (born 1 December 1993) is a Tunisian handball player who plays for Espérance Sportive de Tunis and the Tunisian national team.

He represented Tunisia at the 2019 World Men's Handball Championship.

References

1993 births
Living people
Tunisian male handball players
Competitors at the 2018 Mediterranean Games
Mediterranean Games silver medalists for Tunisia
Mediterranean Games medalists in handball
20th-century Tunisian people
21st-century Tunisian people